Faecalibacter macacae is a bacterium from the genus of Faecalibacter which has been isolated from faeces of an Assam macaque.

References 

Flavobacteria
Bacteria described in 2020